is a passenger railway station in the city of Minamibōsō, Chiba Prefecture, Japan, operated by the East Japan Railway Company (JR East).

Lines

Station layout
The station is an at-grade station with two sets of rails running between two opposing side platforms connected by a footbridge. The station is unattended.

Platforms

History
Wadaura Station was opened on December 20, 1922. The station was absorbed into the JR East network upon the privatization of the Japan National Railways (JNR) on April 1, 1987. A whale-shaped station building was completed in 1995.

Passenger statistics
In fiscal 2015, the station was used by an average of 94 passengers daily (boarding passengers only).

Surrounding area
 Wadaura Seawater Bath
 Minamibōsō City Hall Wada Branch (Formerly the Wada Town Hall)
 
 Hiking path to Mount Karasuba

See also
 List of railway stations in Japan

References

External links

 JR East Station information  

Railway stations in Chiba Prefecture
Railway stations in Japan opened in 1922
Uchibō Line
Minamibōsō